The rapid fire pistol is the only shooting event on the current Olympic programme that dates back to 1896, since the removal of the men's free pistol. The current rapid fire pistol event is the ISSF 25 meter rapid fire pistol. The format and rules for the rapid fire pistol event changed widely in the early Olympics. The event format has been largely standardized since 1924, though there have been significant rule changes since.

There has never been a women's version of the rapid fire pistol event; the current programme pairs the men's rapid fire pistol with the women's free pistol for gender equality. The event was nominally open to women from 1968 to 1980, although very few women participated these years.
There has never been a women's version of the rapid fire pistol event; the current programme pairs the men's rapid fire pistol with the women's free pistol for gender equality. Women were nominally able to compete against men in the 1968 through 1980 Games, although very few women participated these years. 

A team event was held twice, in 1912 and 1920.

Variants
The early Games had a few variants of the event:

 1896: The event featured "muzzle-loading" pistols, which were required to be of .45 caliber. The distance was 25 metres, the current standard. As with other 1896 events, a multiplicative scoring system was used. Timing is unknown.
 1900: This event was limited to professionals (a significant departure from the general amateurism principles of the time). Only six shots were fired per shooter. The pistols used are sometimes described as "military" pistols. Timing is unknown. Distance was 20 metres.
 1912: This was a "dueling pistols" event. The timing in this event involved single shots rather than true rapid fire, but the target would appear for only 3 seconds for each shot. A full silhouette target was used. Distance was 30 metres. Hits, rather than score, was used as the first criterion for ranking shooters; only those tied on hits were sorted by score.
 1920: Like 1900, this is sometimes identified as a "military" pistols event. The distance was 30 metres. Shooters fired 30 shots each, with targets that had scoring circles up to 10 points apiece. Shooters had the option of using their team event score or shooting again for the individual match.
 1924–1936: These three Games used variations on a hit-or-miss theme. Shots were fired in series of 6 shots, each at 6 targets. The score for the series was how many targets were hit; there were no scoring rings. The initial round used 3 series (maximum score 18), while successive rounds of 1 series each were used to narrow the field from those who scored perfectly. In 1924, the first round had the targets available for 10 seconds, with all later rounds being 8 seconds; for the other two Games, the first round was 8 seconds and the later rounds got faster each round, down to 2 seconds in the fifth round.

Medals

Men

Multiple medalists

Medalists by nation

Team rapid fire pistol

Men

References

Rapid fire pistol
Rapid fire pistol at the Olympics